Springwood School is a private school in Lanett, Alabama, United States. The school was founded in 1970 and has been described as segregation academy.

References

External links

Segregation academies in Alabama
Private high schools in Alabama
Schools in Chambers County, Alabama
Private middle schools in Alabama
Private elementary schools in Alabama
Private K-12 schools in Alabama